In theoretical physics, in the context of M-theory, the action for the N=8 M2 branes in full is (with some indices hidden):

where [, ] is a generalisation of a Lie bracket which gives the group constants.

The only known compatible solution however is:

using the Levi-Civita symbol which is invariant under SO(4) rotations. M5 branes can be introduced by using an infinite symmetry group.

The action is named after Jonathan Bagger, Neil Lambert, and Andreas Gustavsson.

Notes

References
Lie 3-Algebra and Multiple M2-branes

String theory